William Henry Bartlett (March 26, 1809 – September 13, 1854) was a British artist, best known for his numerous drawings rendered into steel engravings.

Biography
Bartlett was born in Kentish Town, London in 1809. He was apprenticed to John Britton (1771–1857), and became one of the foremost illustrators of topography of his generation. He travelled throughout Britain, and in the mid and late 1840s he travelled extensively in the Balkans and the Middle East. He made four visits to North America between 1836 and 1852.

In 1835, Bartlett first visited the United States to draw the buildings, towns and scenery of the northeastern states. The finely detailed steel engravings Bartlett produced were published uncolored with a text by Nathaniel Parker Willis as American Scenery; or Land, Lake, and River: Illustrations of Transatlantic Nature. American Scenery was published by George Virtue in London in 30 monthly installments from 1837 to 1839. Bound editions of the work were published from 1840 onward. In 1838 Bartlett was in the Canadas producing sketches for Willis' Canadian scenery illustrated, published in 1842. Following a trip to the Middle East, he published Walks about the city and environs of Jerusalem in 1840.

Bartlett made sepia wash drawings the exact size to be engraved.  His engraved views were widely copied by artists, but no signed oil painting by his hand is known. Engravings based on Bartlett's views were later used in his posthumous History of the United States of North America, continued by Bernard Bolingbroke Woodward and published around 1856.

Bartlett's primary concern was to render "lively impressions of actual sights", as he wrote in the preface to The Nile Boat (London, 1849). Many views contain some ruin or element of the past including many scenes of churches, abbeys, cathedrals and castles, and Nathaniel Parker Willis described Bartlett's talent thus: "Bartlett could select his point of view so as to bring prominently into his sketch the castle or the cathedral, which history or antiquity had allowed".

Bartlett returning from his last trip to the Near East suddenly took ill and died of fever on board the French steamer Egyptus off the coast of Malta in 1854. His widow Susanna lived for almost 50 years after his death, and died in London on 25 October 1902, aged 91.

Works

References

Bibliography
Janice Tyrwhitt and Henry C. Campbell, Bartlett’s Canada: A Pre-Confederation Journey (McClelland and Stewart Limited: Toronto, 1968).

External links 

 Bartlett Prints in the collection of the Niagara Falls Public Library (Ont.)
 William H. Bartlett Prints, 1837–1842, a finding aid to a New York State Library collection of copies of some of Bartlett's prints.
 Bartlett, W. H. in CAPITAL COLLECTIONS
 Biography at the Dictionary of Canadian Biography Online
 
 
 
 Paintings for Fisher's Drawing Room Scrap Books, with poetical illustrations by Letitia Elizabeth Landon.
1832:, engraved by LePetit.
1832:, engraved by Robert Brandard.
1833:, engraved by J C Varrall.
1837:, engraved by S Smith.
1837:, engraved by J Redaway. See Francis Rawdon Chesney under The Euphrates Expedition.
1838,, engraved by John Cousen.
1838,, engraved by James Baylis Allen with The Cedars of Lebanon by L. E. L.
1838,, engraved by William Joseph Taylor.
1839,, engraved by W Floyd.
1839,, engraved by J Tingle.
1839,,engraved by J Redaway.
1840,, engraved by J Redaway.
 engraved by T. Dixon for Fisher's Drawing Room Scrap Book, 1832, with an article on blarney by Letitia Elizabeth Landon.

1809 births
1854 deaths
English engravers
Landscape artists
People from Kentish Town
Holy Land travellers